Durai Chandrasekaran is an Indian politician and incumbent Member of the Legislative Assembly of Tamil Nadu. He was elected four times to the Tamil Nadu legislative assembly as a Dravida Munnetra Kazhagam candidate from Tiruvaiyaru constituency in the 1989, 1996, 2006 and 2016 elections. He lost the seat to P. Kaliyaperumal of the All India Anna Dravida Munnetra Kazhagam (AIADMK) in the 1991 election and to K. Ayyaru Vandayar of the same party in 2001.

He is Thanjavur Central DMK District secretary.

Electoral performance

References 

Dravida Munnetra Kazhagam politicians
Living people
Tamil Nadu MLAs 1996–2001
Tamil Nadu MLAs 2006–2011
Tamil Nadu MLAs 2016–2021
Year of birth missing (living people)
Tamil Nadu MLAs 2021–2026
Tamil Nadu politicians